Anthony Gilbert (–1555), of East Coker, Corton Denham, and Wells, Somerset, was an English politician.

He was a Member (MP) of the Parliament of England for Wells in 1545.

References

1499 births
1555 deaths
English MPs 1545–1547
Politicians from Somerset